The 2010 Big West Conference men's basketball tournament took place on March 10–13, 2010 at the Anaheim Convention Center Arena in Anaheim, California. The winner of the tournament was UC Santa Barbara. The Gauchos received the conference's automatic bid to the 2010 NCAA Men's Division I Basketball Tournament.

Format
The top two seed received byes into the semifinals. Seeds 3 and 4 received byes into the quarterfinals.

Television
The first round and quarterfinals games were broadcast online via BigWest.TV. The semifinals were broadcast on ESPNU and the championship game was broadcast on ESPN2.

Tournament Bracket

References

Tournament
Big West Conference men's basketball tournament
Big West Conference men's basketball tournament
Big West Conference men's basketball tournament